The Bobby Fuller Four (sometimes stylized as Bobby Fuller 4) was a popular mid-1960s American rock & roll band started by Bobby Fuller. First formed in 1962 in Fuller's hometown of El Paso, Texas, the group went on to produce some of its most memorable hits under the Mustang Records label in Hollywood, California. The band's most successful songs include "Let Her Dance", "I Fought the Law" and "Love's Made a Fool of You".

History
Fuller recorded his first single, "You're in Love", in 1961. Recorded in his parents' living room with The Embers, a local band he played in, it became a regional hit. Fuller started a new band in 1962, backed by his brother Randy on bass and Gaylord Grimes on drums. They had their single, "Gently My Love", professionally recorded at Norman Petty Recording Studios in Clovis, New Mexico. Although they achieved another regional hit, Fuller was not satisfied.

Disengaging from Yucca Records in Alamogordo, which had released his first two records, Fuller and his band began releasing their records through Fuller's own various independent labels, with the recordings done in Fuller's home recording studio. The group never had a definite name and recordings were credited to either "Bobby Fuller", or "Bobby Fuller and the Fanatics". Various additional members played in the band, the most significant being Jim Reese (formerly of the Embers) on guitar, and Dalton Powell (who had played piano for the Embers) on drums.

By 1963, the band pursued a record deal with a major label in Hollywood, California. While they were neglected by most labels, Bob Keane of Del-Fi Records showed particular interest in the group. While he saw potential, he didn't think the band had hit material yet. Fuller and his band returned to El Paso and continued to release regional hits, the most popular being "I Fought the Law", originally by the Crickets. By the end of 1964, Fuller saw branching out to a major label as their only option, thus Bobby Fuller, Randy Fuller, and Jim Reese prepared to move to California to revisit Del-Fi Records. Current drummer Dalton Powell could not make the move due to family commitments, and was replaced by another drummer, DeWayne Quirico, instructed by Fuller in person.

The band appeared as "themselves" in the 1966 film "The Ghost in the Invisible Bikini"—a comedy combining the ubiquitous beach, horror, and biker themes of the day. They back Nancy Sinatra on the song "Geronimo" and perform "Make The Music Pretty" and other incidental music.

Del-Fi Records
With the group's new hit records, Keane signed them to Del-Fi this time around. The band's first Del-Fi release, "Those Memories of You" was under the sister label, Donna Records (credited to Bobby Fuller and the Fanatics). With the band's increasing local popularity, Keane created a sister label just for Fuller's band, Mustang Records. The first release on Mustang was "Thunder Reef" in 1965. This time, the band was credited as The Shindigs to capitalize on the new ABC show, Shindig! Seeking a more permanent name, Keane decided upon The Bobby Fuller Four (as he favored Fuller), which was first used on the band's next single, "Take My Word". The new name received mixed reactions with the rest of the group, claiming that it put too much emphasis on Fuller, as opposed to the rest of the band, but the name stuck

While their next release, "Never to be Forgotten" brought a regional hit, the band's next single, "Let Her Dance" brought the band's first national hit, barely missing the Billboard Hot 100 at 133, though bringing in a Top 40 hit. At the suggestion of Randy Fuller, the El Paso hit, "I Fought the Law" was re-recorded. It quickly gained national popularity, and by 1966, it rose to its peak position at No. 9 on the national charts. Meanwhile, the band was starting to experience internal troubles after touring, and drummer DeWayne Quirico abruptly left the group. John Barbata was asked to take his place, while negotiations were underway to get Dalton Powell back in the band.
While performing at L.A. venue "P.J." the band produced a
memorable performance of "I fought the law" featuring
the go-go dancer Lada St. Edmund into the NBC 
television show Hullaballoo, and also partecipated
to another TV show, Shivaree.

With Powell reinstated, the group went on to release "Love's Made a Fool of You", another Crickets cover (written by Buddy Holly and Bob Montgomery and recorded by Holly as a demo, reportedly intended for the Everly Brothers, though never recorded by that duo). This went on to become another national hit for the band. The next single was taken from the sessions where Barbata sat in, "The Magic Touch". While being popular locally, it did not match the success of the previous singles. In addition to the already existing internal problems, the band began to fall apart in July after Reese had received a draft notice in the mail (and arranged to sell his Jaguar XKE to Fuller), Powell also planned to announce his plans to leave the band to support his family back home.

Aftermath
Bobby Fuller died under mysterious circumstances on July 18, 1966. His body was found beaten inside his car parked just outside of his Hollywood home. Evidence suggests that he had ingested gasoline. Initially, these details were not released to the public. Although many of his friends suspected he might have been murdered by mobsters, Fuller's death was officially ruled a suicide by police.

After the death of Fuller, the band abruptly disbanded. The group's final single, "It's Love, Come What May" was only released in limited quantities as a promotional recording. Months later, Keane arranged the formation of the Randy Fuller Four in an attempt to capitalize on the previous success of the Bobby Fuller Four, complete with Randy Fuller on bass and rhythm guitar, DeWayne Quirico returning on drums, and Mike Ciccarelli and Howard Steele (other former El Paso musicians) on lead guitar and bass, respectively. The group released a few singles (including overdubbing the Bobby Fuller Four's "It's Love, Come What May"), but disbanded less than a year later in 1967 without any chart success.

Most former members of the Bobby Fuller Four remained active in the music industry after the group disbanded. Jim Reese died in 1991 after suffering a fatal heart attack whilst playing a round of golf.

Bobby has been the subject of 2 books: " I Fought The Law: The Life and Strange Death of Bobby Fuller" by Miriam Linna & Randell Fuller (2015); and "Rock & Roll Mustangs" by Stephen J. McParland (2009 and with an updated edition released in 2021).

Discography

Singles

ATracks from the first Mustang album also featured on the follow-up album "I Fought the Law"
1 Singles released as by Bobby Fuller
2 Released as by Bobby Fuller and The Fanatics
3 Released as by The Shindigs
4 Released as by Randy Fuller, but actually recorded by The Bobby Fuller Four with Randy's vocals overdubbed on A-side

Original US albums
 KRLA King of the Wheels (Mustang M-900 [mono] / MS-900 [stereo], 1965)
 I Fought The Law (Mustang M-901 [mono] / MS-901 [stereo], 1966)
 Celebrity Night At PJ's (cancelled — originally to be released as Mustang M-902 [mono] / MS-902 [stereo]; finally issued in the Never To Be Forgotten: The Mustang Years box set)

Compilations and reissues
 The Bobby Fuller Memorial Album (LP, President 1003, 1968)
 The Best of the Bobby Fuller Four (LP, Rhino RNDF-201, 1981) 
 KRLA King of the Wheels (LP, Line LP-5146, 1981) 
 I Fought the Law (LP, Line LP-5133, 1981) 
 The Bobby Fuller Memorial Album (LP, Strand 6.24885, 1982)
 Let Them Dance (The Rare Sides) (LP, OutLine OLLP-5272, 1983) 
 Live on Stage (LP, OutLine OLLP-5302, 1983) 
 I Fought the Law (LP, Eva 12032, 1983) 
 Live Again (LP, Eva 12046, 1984) 
 The Best of The Bobby Fuller Four (CD, Rhino 70174, 1990) 
 The Bobby Fuller Four (CD, Ace CDCHD-956, 1990) 
 Live at PJ's...Plus! (CD, Ace CDCHD-314, 1991) 
 The Best of The Bobby Fuller Four (CD, Ace CDCHD-388, 1992) 
 The Bobby Fuller Four (CD, Del-Fi DFCD-70174, 1994) 
 Never to Be Forgotten: The Mustang Years (3-CD box set, Mustang/Del-Fi DFBX-3903, 1997) 
 The Mustang Years (2LP, Munster MR-184, 2000) 
 I Fought the Law and Others (7" EP, Munster 7141, 2000) 
 I Fought the Law: The Best of The Bobby Fuller Four (CD, Del-Fi/Rhino 71904, 2001) 
 I Fought the Law and Other Hits (CD, Flashback/Rhino 78170, 2004) 
 Rhino Hi-Five: The Bobby Fuller Four (CD, Rhino 7????, 2006)
 Magic Touch: The Complete Mustang Singles Collection (CD, Now Sounds [UK] WCRNOW-57, 2018)

Members

Timeline

References

Rock music groups from Texas
Garage rock groups from Texas
Musical groups established in 1962
Musical groups disestablished in 1966
Musical quartets
Del-Fi Records artists
Musical groups from El Paso, Texas
1962 establishments in Texas